Sadhu Mirandal is a 1966 Indian Tamil-language crime thriller film directed by the duo Thirumalai–Mahalingam. It was produced by A. Bhimsingh, who also wrote the screenplay based on a real incident about a bank official being murdered for money by three people in a moving car. The film stars Nagesh and T. R. Ramachandran. Released on 14 April 1966, it became a critical and commercial success, and was later remade in Hindi by Bhimsingh as Sadhu Aur Shaitaan (1969).

Plot

Cast 
 Nagesh as the taxi driver
 T. R. Ramachandran as Pasupathy
 O. A. K. Thevar as Narasimhan
 Manorama as Karpagam
 Kalpana as Kalpana
 Kutty Padmini as the bank manager's daughter
 Master Prabhakar as the bank manager's son

Production 
On 13 November 1958 in Madras (now Chennai), Suryanarayana, a bank official, was murdered for money by his friend Narayana Swamy and associates Vijayakumar and Joginder, while travelling via Narayana Swamy's car after taking a large sum of cash from his bank's head office in Parry's Corner to his branch in T. Nagar. Vijayakumar and Narayana Swamy were apprehended, but Joginder escaped. This incident became known as the "Suryanarayana Murder Case", and inspired A. Bhimsingh to write a screenplay. He produced it under the banner Sree Venkateswara Cinetone as the film Sadhu Mirandal, which his assistants Thirumalai–Mahalingam directed. The story and dialogues were written by Usilai Somanathan. Art direction was handled by H. Shantaram, editing by A. Paul Durai Singham and cinematography by G. Vittal Rao. A. Veerappan also contributed to the script, but was not credited. It is the feature film debut of Master Prabhakar.

Soundtrack 
The soundtrack was composed by T. K. Ramamoorthy, while the lyrics were written by Alangudi Somu and Thanjai Vanan. Ramamoorthy earlier composed for films with M. S. Viswanathan (under the name Viswanathan–Ramamoorthy) and this was his first film as a solo composer. One song, "A for Apple... B for Biscuit...", written by Thanjai Vaanan and sung by A. L. Raghavan and L. R. Eswari, attained popularity, as did "Arulvaaye Nee Arulvaaye", sung by M. Balamuralikrishna. This song is set in the Carnatic raga Sindhu Bhairavi.

Release and reception 
Sadhu Mirandal was released on 14 April 1966, and was distributed by Sun Beam. The film became a commercial success, and received acclaim from Kalki for its innovative storyline and making.

References

Bibliography

External links 
 

1960s crime thriller films
1960s Tamil-language films
1966 films
Fictional portrayals of the Tamil Nadu Police
Films about organised crime in India
Films set in Chennai
Indian black-and-white films
Indian crime thriller films
Films scored by T. K. Ramamoorthy
Indian films based on actual events
Tamil films remade in other languages